Drying Nets or Fishermen Spreading Their Nets is an 1872 oil-on-canvas painting by Alfred Sisley, now in the Kimbell Art Museum. The painting shows a scene near the village of Villeneuve-la-Garenne.

Like The Seine at Argenteuil painted the same year and The Seine at Port-Marly, Piles of Sand, it shows people at work on the River Seine near Argenteuil, Val-d'Oise. These contrast with the many works by Sisley and the other Impressionists that show the Seine as a place of leisure.

References

Paintings by Alfred Sisley
1872 paintings
Paintings in the collection of the Kimbell Art Museum
Maritime paintings